John Boswall (2 May 1920 – 6 June 2011) was a British actor probably best known for playing Wyvern in Pirates of the Caribbean: Dead Man's Chest.

Early life and education 
Boswall was born John Stuart on 2 May 1920 in Oxfordshire, England. Prior to his career as an actor, he attended the University of Oxford and served in Burma during World War II.

Career 
Boswall's television appearances included Paul Temple (1971), Wessex Tales (1973), Lady Killer (1973), Edward the Seventh (1975), The Onedin Line (1976), Love in a Cold Climate (1980), The Hound of the Baskervilles (1982), Sapphire & Steel (1982), No Place Like Home (1986), EastEnders (1990), Selling Hitler (1991), Agatha Christie's Poirot (1991), Drop the Dead Donkey (1993), Lovejoy (1993), Poldark (1996), Doctors (2000), Rome (2005) and Terry Pratchett's Hogfather (2006).

Stage appearances included Edward Bond's The Fool at the Royal Court Theatre (1975), Sweeney Todd at the Little Theatre, Bristol (1978–79); Oh, What A Lovely War!, A Midsummer Night’s Dream (1979–80), and Kiss Me, Kate (1980–81) at the Bristol Old Vic; Henry IV, Part I (1984–85) at the Theatre Royal, Bath; Doctor Faustus (1974), Cymbeline (1974) and Camille (1985–86) with the Royal Shakespeare Company; and Moliere's Bourgeois gentilhomme (1992) at the Royal National Theatre.

His films included Nineteen Eighty-Four as Emmanuel Goldstein (1984), Three Men and a Little Lady (1990), The Wind in the Willows (1996), The Messenger: The Story of Joan of Arc (1999), Hotel Splendide (2000), Ladies in Lavender (2004), Pirates of the Caribbean: Dead Man's Chest (2006) and Morris: A Life with Bells On (2009).

Death 
Boswall died of pancreatic cancer on 6 June 2011 at the age of 91, in South Woodchester, Gloucestershire, England. He was never married.

Filmography

References

External links
 
 Detailed theatrical career on Theatricalia.com

1920 births
2011 deaths
Alumni of the University of Oxford
British Army personnel of World War II
English male television actors
English male film actors
English male stage actors
Deaths from pancreatic cancer
Deaths from cancer in England
British people in British Burma